Alexander Dmitriyevich Zhukov (born 1 June 1956) is a Russian economist and politician. Zhukov was a member of the State Duma from 1994 to 2004. He is the First Deputy Chairman of the State Duma of the Federal Assembly. Previously he was also the President of the Russian Olympic Committee.

Early life 
Alexander Zhukov was born in 1956 in Moscow.

He graduated from high school No. 444 in Moscow, then the Faculty of Economics of the Moscow State University (1978) with a degree in economics and mathematics. Then he studied at the Higher Economic Courses at the State Planning Committee of the USSR. Zhukov is an alumnus of Harvard Business School. Specialist in the field of currency, tax and customs legislation.

Career

Financist 
In 1980–91 Zhukov was an employee of the Monetary and Economic Department of the USSR Ministry of Finance: economist, senior expert, chief expert, deputy head, and head of the branch for foreign economic relations.

In 1988, working very closely with Zhukov, Boris Fyodorov, and Kirill Ugolnikov, Deloitte & Touche began providing services to the Soviet Union and continued with Russia. From 1986 to 1989 he was a member of Baumansky District Council, Moscow. 1991–93 — Vice President of the Avtotraktoroexport JSC.

Member of parliament 
In 1993 Zhukov elected to the First State Duma of Russia from the Preobrazhensky constituency of Moscow as a representative of the Dignity and Charity bloc, supported by the Choice of Russia. He was a member of the Committee on budget, taxes, banks and finance, chairman of the Subcommittee on exchange regulation, foreign debt and precious metals. He was a member and deputy chairman of the parliamentary group "Liberal Democratic Union of December 12".

In February 1995 he was elected to the coordinating council of "Forward, Russia!" movement led by Boris Fyodorov, and chairman of the Moscow regional organization. In December Zhukov was reelected in Preobrazhensky constituency from "Forward, Russia!" and became chairman of the Committee on budget. He was a member of the "Russian Regions" faction. In 1999 he was running from Fatherland — All Russia and in 2003 from United Russia.

In the cabinet 
After the formation of the new cabinet in March 2004 Zhukov became Deputy Prime Minister of Russia under Mikhail Fradkov. He was the chairman of the Commission on legislative activity and the Commission on issues of international humanitarian and technical assistance. His additional positions were coordinator of the Russian Tripartite Commission for the Regulation of Social and Labor Relations since May 2004, and chairman of the Board of Trustees of the Federal Housing Development Foundation since July 2008. Zhukov was one of the organizers of the monetization of benefits, a 2005 reform which caused widespread protests in Russia.

Return to the Duma 
In December 2011, Zhukov was elected a deputy of the sixth State Duma of Russia on the list of United Russia. On December 21, he was elected First Deputy Chairman of the State Duma and became a member of the Committee on budget and taxes. He successfully reelected in September 2016.

From 2010 to 2018 Zhukov was the president of the Russian Olympic Committee and became an IOC member at the 125th IOC Session in Buenos Aires in September 2013. He was also president of the Russian Chess Federation from 2003 to 2009.

Honours
Order of Merit for the Fatherland, 4th class (1 June 2006), 3rd class (4 May 2011) – for services to the state and many years of diligent work
Order of Honour (24 April 2003) – for active legislative activity and many years of honest work
Order of Alexander Nevsky (24 March 2014) – for a great contribution to the organization of the 22nd Olympic and 11th Paralympic Winter Games of 2014 in Sochi
Diploma of the President of Russia (4 December 2009) – for active participation in preparing and conducting the All-Russia Forum "Russia — Sports Power"
Order of Holy Prince Daniel of Moscow (Russian Orthodox Church, 2011)

References

Lenta.ru.  Alexander Zhukov 
Bigmir.net.  Олимпийский комитет России получил нового руководителя 

1956 births
Living people
Moscow State University alumni
Economists from Moscow
International Olympic Committee members
Harvard Business School alumni
21st-century Russian politicians
First convocation members of the State Duma (Russian Federation)
Second convocation members of the State Duma (Russian Federation)
Third convocation members of the State Duma (Russian Federation)
Fourth convocation members of the State Duma (Russian Federation)
Sixth convocation members of the State Duma (Russian Federation)
Seventh convocation members of the State Duma (Russian Federation)
Eighth convocation members of the State Duma (Russian Federation)
Presidents of the Russian Olympic Committee